Lepidodactylus planicauda, also known as the Mindanao scaly-toed gecko or small broad-tailed smooth-scaled gecko, is a species of gecko. It is endemic to the Philippines.

References

Lepidodactylus
Reptiles of the Philippines
Endemic fauna of the Philippines
Taxa named by Leonhard Stejneger
Reptiles described in 1905
Taxobox binomials not recognized by IUCN